The 1986 UCI Track Cycling World Championships were the World Championship for track cycling. They took place in Colorado Springs, United States in 1986. Fourteen events were contested, 12 for men (5 for professionals, 7 for amateurs) and 2 for women.

Medal summary

Medal table

References

Track cycling
UCI Track Cycling World Championships by year
International cycle races hosted by the United States
1986 in track cycling